Yelovsky is an extinct shield volcano in central Kamchatka. The volcano is the edifice among several overlapping small basaltic shield volcanoes. Yelovsky is located at the east of the crest of the Sredinny Range.

See also
 List of volcanoes in Russia

References

Volcanoes of the Kamchatka Peninsula
Shield volcanoes of Russia
Mountains of the Kamchatka Peninsula
Holocene shield volcanoes
Holocene Asia